Nisha Ravikrishnan, also known as Nisha Milana, is an actress in the Kannada television. She began her career in television during her school days. She hosted diverse programs on Chintu Television. Her debut as an actress came with the serial Sarvamangala Mangalye. After working for a few months in Sarvamangala Mangalye , she got an opportunity to play a lead role in the serial Gattimela on Zee Kannada.

Life and career 
Nisha was born to Ravikrishnan and Usha. Ravikrishnan used to perform stage plays with the Mandya Ramesh's team. Inspired by her father, she started taking interest in stage plays and cultural activities. She is trained in Carnatic music and Bharatanatyam. She hosted her debut programme on Chintu Television during her school days. She was seen as back dancer (Bharatanatyam Dancer) in a song named 'Nee Nanagoskara' of Kannada film Ishtakamya. Her first opportunity as an actor came through Sarva Mangala Managalye, a serial on Star Suvarna where she portrayed the role of lead character sister. After working for a few years in supporting roles, she got an opportunity as the lead actress in Gattimela opposite Rakshith Gowda of Putta Gowri Maduve fame.

Recognitions
Nisha was named in the list of Bengaluru Times Most Desirable Women in Television for the year 2019.

Filmography

Television

Films

Awards 

|-
! scope="row" | 2019
| Gattimela
| Favourite Actor in Lead Role (Female)
| Zee Kannada Kutumba Awards
| 
|Received from Bharathi Vishnuvardhan
|
|-
! scope="row" | 2019
| Gattimela
| Favourite Jodi (with Rakshith Gowda)
| Zee Kannada Kutumba Awards
| 
|Received from Sathish Ninasam
|
|-
! scope="row" | 2020
| Gattimela
| Best Actor in Lead Role (Female)
| Zee Kannada Kutumba Awards
| 
|Received from Dhananjay
|
|-
! scope="row" | 2020
| Gattimela
| Popular Jodi (with Rakshith Gowda)
| Zee Kannada Kutumba Awards
| 
|Received from Ramji,Arooru Jagdish
|
|-
! scope="row" | 2021
| Gattimela
| Favorite Actor in Lead Role (Female)
| Zee Kannada Kutumba Awards
| 
|Received from Malashri
|
|-
! scope="row" | 2021
| Gattimela
| Popular Jodi (with Rakshith Gowda)
| Zee Kannada Kutumba Awards
| 
|Received from Shiva Rajkumar
|

References

External links 

 
 Gattimela Moments

Year of birth missing (living people)
Kannada actresses
Actresses in Kannada cinema
Living people
Actresses from Karnataka
Actresses from Bangalore
Indian film actresses
21st-century Indian actresses
Actresses in Kannada television